Coghlan is a small South African village in the Eastern Cape on the road between Ngcobo and Mthatha and due north from Xuka Drift on the Xuka River. The Xuka River and the Xinika River are the two main tributaries of the Mbashe River.

It has a guest house and village shop.

See also
 Charles Patrick John Coghlan

References

External links
 No bridge over troubled waters

Populated places in the Engcobo Local Municipality